A World of Strangers is a 1958 novel by South African novelist and Nobel Laureate Nadine Gordimer. The novel included mixed reviews, drawing criticism for its pedantic explanation of Gordimer's worldview. The novel was banned in South Africa for 12 years.

The novel's main plot focuses on depicting the divisions and boundaries that Apartheid and international capitalism create within South African society. The novel thematically focuses on liberalism in South Africa and in the international community.

Adaptation 

In 1962, a Danish film adaptation of the novel was released under the title Dilemma by Danish film director, Henning Carlsen, and starring  Ivan Jackson, Evelyn Frank, and Marijke Mann. The film won the Grand prize at the 1962 Mannheim-Heidelberg International Filmfestival.
In the U.K. this film was released under the title A World of Strangers due to an unrelated U.K. crime thriller being released in the same year under the same name.

References

Further reading

1958 novels
20th-century South African novels
Novels by Nadine Gordimer
Apartheid novels
Simon & Schuster books
Censored books